Shaykh Ahmad bin Zayn al-Dín bin Ibráhím al-Ahsá'í (May 1753–27 June 1826), commonly known as Shaykh Ahmad or al-Ahsá'í, was a prominent Shia Muslim theologian and jurist who founded the influential Shaykhí school of Twelver Shiism, which attracted followers from throughout the Persian and Ottoman Empires.

He was a native of the Al-Ahsa region (Eastern Arabian Peninsula), educated in Bahrain and the theological centres of Najaf and Karbala in Iraq. Spending the last twenty years of his life in Iran, he received the protection and patronage of princes of the Qajar dynasty. His ancestors were nomadic Sunnis.

Shaykh Ahmad diverged from the Usuli school on key issues related to eschatology, the role of the ulama, and the proper interpretation of the mystical hadith of the Twelve Imams. These divergences, according to Bahá'í scholar Peter Smith, resulted in accusations of heresy from orthodox members of the Shia ulama, and instances of persecution against Ahsá'í and his followers occurred during and after his lifetime. His teachings were complex, thus he often practised Taqayya concealing his controversial ideas from his opponents.

Today, Shaykhí populations retain a minority following in Iran and Iraq. After the death of Shaykh Ahmad's successor, Kazim Rashti, many Shaykhís converted to Bábism and the Baháʼí faith; the two Shaykhí leaders continue to be highly regarded by the Babis and the Baháʼís, being seen as spiritual forerunners to their religions.

History

Early life
Little is documented about the early life of Shaykh Ahmad, except that he was born in al-Ahsa, in the northeast of the Arabian peninsula, to a Shiʻi family with Sunni ancestry in either the year 1166 AH (1753 CE), or 1157 AH (1744 CE). Nabíl's Narrative, a history of the Baháʼí faith, describes his spiritual awakening as follows:

While it is unclear how much of Nabil's interpretation is consistent with Shaykh Ahmad's true feelings, the underlying motivations for reform, and ultimately for messianic expectation, become somewhat clearer.

Education and Mission
Shaykh Ahmad, at about age forty (1784 or 1794 - circa), began to study in earnest in the Shiʻi centres of religious scholarship such as Karbala and Najaf. He attained sufficient recognition in such circles to be declared a mujtahid, an interpreter of Islamic Law. He contended with Sufi and Neo-Platonist scholars, and attained a positive reputation among their detractors. He declared that all knowledge and sciences were contained (in essential form) within the Quran, and that to excel in the sciences, all knowledge must be gleaned from the Quran. To this end he developed systems of interpretation of the Quran and sought to inform himself of all the sciences current in the Muslim world.

He also evinced a veneration of the Imams, even beyond the extent of his pious contemporaries and espoused heterodox views on the afterlife, the resurrection and end-times, as well as medicine and cosmology. His views on the soul posited a "subtle body" separate from, and associated with the physical body, and this also altered his views on the occultation of the Imam Muhammad al-Mahdi. His views resulted in his denunciation by several learned clerics, and he engaged in many debates before moving on to Persia where he settled for a time in the province of Yazd. It was in Yazd that much of his books and letters were written.

Dreams and Visions 
He experienced a series of dreams and visions. In one such dream recounted by him, he believed that he was granted permission to transmit knowledge by each of the twelve Imams. In another dream he saw Imam Hasan teaching him Quranic verses.

Founding the Shaykhi School
Juan Cole summarises the situation at the advent of the Shaykhi School, and the questions that were unfolding as his views crystallised and he acquired an early following:

Bahá'í scholar, Moojan Momen in his Introduction to Shiʻi Islam (George Ronald, Oxford, 1985) states that many mujtahids were afraid that the Shaykh's preference for intuitive knowledge, which he claimed to obtain directly by inspiration from the Imams, would seriously undermine the authority of their position. Momen has some interesting and useful commentary on Shaykh Ahmad's doctrines and his succession during which the conflict with Shiʻi orthodoxy intensified.

Bahá'í scholar, Nader Saiedi in his Gate of the Heart (Wilfrid Laurier University Press, 2010) has characterised his followers by their fervent millenarian expectations, their complex mystical and esoteric knowledge, their insistence on the absolute transcendence of the divine Essence, their rejection of the doctrine of wahdatu’l-wujúd, their reinterpretation of the traditional doctrine of bodily resurrection (ma'ad-i-Jismani), and their ambiguous assertions concerning the necessity of the presence of a living Gate (a Báb) to the Hidden Imám for the guidance of the Shí'i community.

Successor
Shaykh Ahmad appointed Kazim Rashti as his successor, who led the Shaykhí movement until his death. He taught his students how to recognize the Mahdi and the Masih (the returned Jesus). After his death in 1843, many of his students spread out around Iraq and Iran to search for a new leader.

Published works

Shaykh Ahmad was a prolific writer, he is known to have completed 71 published works during his career, of which 354 contemporary manuscripts are known to be still extant. Writing primarily in Arabic, his work spanned a wide array of literary forms. The largest number of his works consist of correspondence with other members of the ulama or his students, usually intended to expand upon a teaching advanced in another work, or provide answers to vexing questions of theology or jurisprudence. Treatises and lessons composed independently by al-Ahsáʼí make up a smaller number of his works, but tend to be longer than his correspondence and more commonly studied and reprinted. In keeping with Islamic and Persian literary and academic tradition, a large number of his works take the form of commentaries on Surahs from the Qurʼan, important Hadiths of Muhammad or the Imams, or writing by earlier mystical or theological writers. The most comprehensive bibliography of Ahmad's known works identifies twelve wide subject areas addressed by individual works:

• Sharh al-Hikma al-Arshiyya - a multi-volume commentary on the al-Hikma al-Arshiyya of MuIla Sadra (Tabriz, 1854)

• Sharh al-Fawa'id. Lithographed. N.P. (Tabriz: 1856).

• Jawami' al-Kalim. Lithographed. N.P. (Tabriz: 1856-59).

• Sharh al-Masha'ir. Lithographed. N.P. (Tehran: 1861).

• Sharh al-'Arshiyya. Lithographed. N.P. (Tehran: 1861).

• Sharh al-Ziyara al-Jami'a al-Kabira. Chapkhaneh Sa'adat (Kirman: 1972), 4 Volumes.

• Rasa'il al-Hikma. Al-Da'ira al-'Alamiyya (Beirut: 1993).

Notes

References
 Amir-Moezzi, Mohammad Ali. "Une absence remplie de présences. Herméneutiques de l'occultation chez les Shaykhiyya (Aspects de l'imamologie duodécimaine VII) ," in Bulletin of the School of Oriental and African Studies Vol. 64, No. 1. (2001), pp. 1–18.

Cole, Juan R.I. "The World as Text: Cosmologies of Shaykh Ahmad al-Ahsa'i," in Studia Islamica, No. 80. (1994), pp. 145–163.

 Corbin, Henry. L'ecole Shaykhie en Theologie Shiʻite. Taban (Tehran: 1967).
Corbin, Henry. En islam iranien. Galimard (Paris: 1972), vol. 4.
 MacEoin, Denis. S.V. "Ahsa'i, Shaikh Ahmad b. Zayn al-Din," in Encyclopaedia Iranica, 3 vols. - (London: Routledge and Kegan Paul, 1983 - ).
 MacEoin, Denis. The Messiah of Shiraz. Brill (Leyden, 2008).
Hamid, Idris Samawi. The Metaphysics and Cosmology of Process According to Shaykh Ahmad al-Ahsa'i. (Ph.D. dissertation: State University of New York at Buffalo, 1998).

 

 
 Rafati, Vahid (1979). The Development of Shaykhi Thought in Shiʻi Islam. Ph.D. dissertation, University of California, Los Angeles.

External links
 Sheykh Ahmad Ahsa'i, Iranica
 alabrar.com for more information about Shaykhi teachings. (This site is in the Arabic language.)
 Early Shaykhism - Some biographical notes, translations and studies
 Collected Works of Shaykh Ahmad al-Ahsa'i at H-Bahai Discussion Network

1753 births
1834 deaths
18th-century Arabs
19th-century Arabs
Precursors in religion
Saudi Arabian ayatollahs
Saudi Arabian Shia clerics
Shaykhis
Burials at Jannat al-Baqī